The following is a table of U.S. state, federal district and territory nicknames, including officially adopted nicknames and other traditional nicknames for the 50 U.S. states, the U.S. federal district, as well as five U.S. territories.

State, federal district, and territory nicknames
Official state, federal district, and territory nicknames are highlighted in bold. A state nickname is not to be confused with an official state motto.

See also

List of U.S. state and territory mottos
List of demonyms for U.S. states
List of city nicknames in the United States
List of provincial and territorial nicknames in Canada
 Lists of nicknames: nickname list articles on Wikipedia

Notes

References

External links
Information about U.S. State Nicknames

Nicknames
Nicknames
United States State
Lists of regional nicknames
Nicknames